Raw & Refined is the twentieth studio album by American soul musician Isaac Hayes. The album was released on May 23, 1995, by Virgin Records.

Track listing
All tracks composed and arranged by Isaac Hayes

References

1995 albums
Isaac Hayes albums
albums produced by Isaac Hayes
Virgin Records albums